From the Clouds to the Resistance (literally From the Cloud to the Resistance) is a 1979 Italian drama film directed by Danièle Huillet and Jean-Marie Straub. It competed in the Un Certain Regard section at the 1979 Cannes Film Festival.

Cast
 Olimpia Carlisi - The Cloud
 Guido Lombardi - Issione
 Gino Felici - Ippoloco
 Lori Pelosini - Sarpedonte
 Walter Pardini - Edipo
 Ennio Lauricella - Tiresia
 Andrea Bacci - 1st hunter
 Loris Cavallini - 2nd hunter
 Francesco Ragusa - Litierse
 Fiorangelo Pucci - Eracle
 Dolando Bernardini - Father
 Andrea Filippi - Son
 Mauro Monni - The Bastard
 Carmelo Lacorte - Nuto
 Mario di Mattia - Cinto

Plot
Part One: Six stories taken from Cesare Pavese's Dialoghi con Leuco. 
Philosophical conversations between mythological characters including Nephele/The Cloud (Olimpia Carlisi) and Issione/Ixion (Guido Lombardi), Ippòloco/Hippolochus (Gino Felici) and Sarpedonte/Sarpedon (Lori Pelosini), Edipo/Oedipus (Walter Pardini) and Tiresias (Ennio Lauricella), two hunters (Andrea Bacci and Lori Cavallini) discussing reincarnation of humans punished by the gods, Litierse/Lityerses and Eracle/Heracles (Francesco Ragusa and Fiorangelo Pucci), and a father and son (Dolando Bernardini and Andrea Filippi) who are burning a fire as an annual sacrifice to the land.

Part Two: 
Taken from Cesare Pavese's novel, La Luna e i Falò

After WWII, the emigrant 'The Bastard' (Mauro Monni) comes back to his village in the Langhe (northern Italy) to find that everyone he knew has died and the war has deeply changed relationships between people.

References

External links

1979 films
1970s Italian-language films
1979 drama films
Films directed by Jean-Marie Straub and Danièle Huillet
Italian drama films
1970s Italian films